Skály is a municipality and village in Písek District in the South Bohemian Region of the Czech Republic. It has about 300 inhabitants. The village of Budičovice within the municipality is well preserved and is protected by law as a village monument zone.

Administrative parts

The village of Budičovice is an administrative part of Skály.

Geography
It lies in the České Budějovice Basin. The Skalský Stream flows through the municipality and feeds a set of ponds. The river Blanice partly forms the northern municipal border.

History
The first written mention of Skály is from 1365. The village was owned by various lower nobles, and the owners often changed. In 1397, Jan of Skály was documented as the owner of Skály. Shortly after the village was sold to the Kočka family, who held it until 1509. In 1543, when Skály was property of the Litochleb of Strachotínek family, a fort in the village was mentioned for the first time, but this building has not been preserved.

The village of Budičovice was first mentioned in 1399.

Transport
Skály lies on the railway line of local importance from České Budějovice to Strakonice.

Sights

Budičovice is protected as a village monument zone for its folk architecture from the 19th century. The homesteads have decorated façades in the Folk Baroque style, typical for this region. The landmark of the village green is the Chapel of Saint John of Nepomuk from around 1875.

References

External links

Villages in Písek District